Tob was the name of a place in ancient Israel, mentioned in the Bible.

It is said to be the land to which Jephthah fled from his brothers. The location is not definitely known, but some identify it with the region centering on Taibiyah, southeast of the Sea of Galilee. Since the suffix -iYa means "mine", Taibeyah means basically: "My Tob" or "Our Tob" or "Me (of) Tob" or us, "We of Tob".

In Tob, Jephtha gathered some men until his brothers wanted him back to fight against the Ammonites. The place may be the same as the one mentioned in 2 Samuel 10:6-8, named Ishtob. Some believe it should be translated "men of Tob", rather than "Ishtob".

Tob is also the town referred to in the Amarna letters, circa 1350 BCE. There are about 382 letters, EA 1 through EA 382. There is only one usage of the town (the word TuBu) and in this small group of letters, the leader of the town Tubu is only referred to as the "Man" of the town, i.e. "the Mayor" or "governor". Man was one of many common designations. He would have been a prince type or some local leader equivalent; the chief of a tribe, clan, city, region, etc.  EA letter 205 is the letter from the "Man of Tubu" and is one of (6) letters, all written by the same scribe.

References

Hebrew Bible places